Keep Quiet is a 2016 biographical documentary film about Hungarian politician Csanád Szegedi, known for his anti-semitic comments and membership in the radical nationalist party Jobbik, who later discovered he was Jewish. The British-made film includes interviews with Szegedi, his grandmother who was a former Auschwitz concentration camp survivor and archive footage.

On 14 April 2016 the film premiered at the Tribeca Film Festival in the World Documentary Competition.

Synopsis 
Csanád Szegedi was a member of the Hungarian radical nationalist Jobbik party, who espoused anti-semitic rhetoric. He was a founder of the Magyar Gárda (Hungarian Guard), a now-banned paramilitary wing of Jobbik. Then came a revelation which changed his life: Szegedi's maternal grandparents were Jewish and his grandmother a survivor of Auschwitz concentration camp who, fearing further persecution, had hidden her religious background.

The film follows Szegedi's on his three-year journey to embrace Judaism, forced to confront his family's past, his wrongdoing, and his country's turbulent history. But is this change a genuine process of reparation and spiritual awakening, or is he a desperate man with nowhere to turn?

Reception 
The film received positive reviews from critics. Frank Scheck from The Hollywood Reporter wrote, "Be prepared to talk about it after," and called the film "[An] amazing story... Should provoke strong controversy upon its theatrical release. It's fascinating throughout." Daniel Walber from NonFics called the film "[a] powerful narrative of repentance."

Keep Quiet was featured in "The 10 Best Movies at the 2016 Tribeca Film Festival" in Time Out New York. "If you want a controversial fest title, this is it." Jewish Week commented: "A superb piece of nonfiction filmmaking, telling a story of import with grace and intelligence." Slant Magazine wrote, "The filmmakers astutely reveal how a culture can eat another alive and somehow live with itself."

References

External links

2016 films
2016 documentary films
Documentary films about Jews and Judaism
Documentary films about antisemitism
Orthodox Judaism in Hungary
Jobbik